is a Japanese footballer currently playing as a forward for FC Gifu.

Career statistics

Club
.

Notes

References

External links

1996 births
Living people
Japanese footballers
Association football forwards
Tokyo International University alumni
J3 League players
Japan Soccer College players
FC Gifu players